Heintz Peak is the summit at the north end of the west ridge of the Welch Mountains, about  north of Mount Acton, in Palmer Land, Antarctica. It was mapped by the United States Geological Survey in 1974, and was named by the Advisory Committee on Antarctic Names for Lieutenant Commander Harvey L. Heintz, U.S. Navy, Commander of LC-130 aircraft during Operation Deep Freeze, 1969 and 1970.

See also
Liston Nunatak

References

Mountains of Palmer Land